The Appalachian Regional Commission (ARC) is a United States federal–state partnership that works with the people of Appalachia to create opportunities for self-sustaining economic development and improved quality of life. Congress established ARC to bring the region into socioeconomic parity with the rest of the nation.

The Appalachian Region, as defined by Congress, includes all of West Virginia and portions of 12 other states: Alabama, Georgia, Kentucky, Maryland, Mississippi, New York, North Carolina, Ohio, Pennsylvania, South Carolina, Tennessee, and Virginia.

The Appalachian Regional Commission has 14 members: the governors of the 13 Appalachian states and a federal co-chair, who is appointed by the president and confirmed by the Senate. A professional staff carries out the work of the Commission.

The current federal co-chair is Gayle Conelly Manchin. Manchin was appointed by President Joe Biden and confirmed by the Senate on April 29, 2021 by voice vote. The 2021 states' co-chair was Virginia Governor Ralph Northam prior to the expiration of his term following the 2021 election. Grassroots participation is provided through 73 local development districts, which are multi-county organizations with boards made up of elected officials, business people, and other local leaders. The ARC is a planning, research, advocacy, and funding organization. It does not have any governing power within the region.

Projects
All of ARC's activities must advance at least one of the five strategic investment goals articulated in its 2016–2020 strategic plan adopted in November 2015: 
 creating economic opportunities, 
 developing a ready workforce, 
 investing in infrastructure, including the Appalachian Development Highway System,
 leveraging natural and cultural assets,
 and bolstering leadership and community capacity.
The bulk of ARC funds, which come from a federal appropriation, support grant making across a broad range of categories. All grants require performance measures. A regional research and evaluation program helps inform the agency's work. ARC emphasizes the leveraging of private-sector investments, relies on a broad network of public and private partnerships, and focuses on innovative, regional strategies to help communities help themselves. ARC targets its resources to the areas of greatest need, with at least half of its grants going to projects that benefit economically distressed areas and counties.

ARC's FY 2016 appropriation included $50 million in funding through the Partnerships for Opportunity and Workforce and Economic Revitalization (POWER) Initiative. This multi-agency initiative, launched in 2015, targets federal resources to help diversify economies in communities and regions that have been affected by job losses in coal mining, coal power plant operations, and coal-related supply chain industries due to the changing economics of America's energy production.

The Trump Administration's proposed budget for FY 2018 would have completely eliminated funding for the ARC. However, Senate Majority Leader Mitch McConnell assured constituents no funding would be cut from the ARC. In contrast, President Biden's first budget included $253,000,000 for the ARC. Biden's stimulus proposal budgeted an additional $5.3 Billion in direct aid to local governments in the Appalachian region. One of the ARC's Co-Chairs is also quoted as saying that Biden's proposed American Jobs Plan provides $1B in infrastructure repair to help distressed communities.

How it works
As mandated by Congress, ARC helps coordinate federal, state, and local initiatives to spur economic development in Appalachia.

Each year Congress appropriates funds, which ARC allocates among its member states. The Appalachian governors submit to ARC their state spending plans for the year, which include lists of projects they recommend for funding. The spending plans are reviewed and approved at a meeting of all the governors and the federal co-chair.

The next step is approval of individual projects by the ARC federal co-chair. After the states submit project applications to ARC, each project is reviewed by ARC program analysts. The process is completed when the federal co-chair reviews a project and formally approves it.

ARC is designed as a federal-state partnership that employs a flexible "bottom up" approach, enabling local communities to tailor support to their individual needs. ARC relies on local regional planning agencies (local development districts) to develop effective strategies for local economic development. ARC has made investments in such essentials of comprehensive economic development as a safe and efficient highway system; education, job-training, and health care programs; water and sewer systems; and entrepreneurial and capital market development.

Accomplishments
ARC has helped cut the number of high-poverty counties in Appalachia from 295 in 1960 to 91 in 2015, reduce the infant mortality rate by two-thirds, and double the percentage of high school graduates. From 2010 to 2015, ARC programs helped create or retain over 101,000 jobs in Appalachia through projects that include entrepreneurship, education and training, health care, telecommunications, business development, and basic infrastructure. Grants during that period leveraged almost $2.7 billion in private investments.

ARC commissioned a report on diseases of despair, which found that deaths due to drug overdose, suicide, and alcoholic liver disease were higher than average, especially in the parts of Appalachia under the most economic stress.

From September 1967 to 2008, the Commission published a magazine Appalachia (ISSN 0003-6595), Which was bimonthly from September of 1967 to fall of 1986. Then it was quarterly between summer 1987 to summer/fall 1995 and annual from 2004-2008.

Origins
Beginning in about 1960, the Council of Appalachian Governors, a group of the ten governors of the Appalachian states of Alabama, Georgia, Kentucky, Maryland, North Carolina, South Carolina, Pennsylvania, Tennessee, Virginia, and West Virginia, united to seek federal government assistance for the mountainous portions of their states, which lagged behind the rest of the United States in income, education, health care, and transportation. During the 1960 Presidential campaign, candidate John F. Kennedy met with the governors to hear their concerns and observed living conditions in West Virginia that convinced him of the need for federal assistance to address the region's problems.

Unrest in the coal industry with movements like the Roving Pickets illustrated the need for federal government intervention in Appalachia. Another catalyst that helped lead to the creation of the ARC was the 1962 book Night Comes to the Cumberlands: A Biography of a Depressed Area by Harry M. Caudill on the poverty and history of the Cumberland area of Appalachia, predominantly in Kentucky. This book brought the situation in Appalachia to national attention.

In 1963 President Kennedy formed the President's Appalachian Regional Commission to assist in advancing legislation to bring federal dollars to Appalachia. This legislation, the Appalachian Redevelopment Act, was enacted by Congress in 1965, creating the ARC as a federal agency.  It was signed into law by President Lyndon B. Johnson on March 9, 1965.

The ARC's geographic range of coverage was defined broadly to cover as many economically underdeveloped areas as possible; as a result, it extends beyond the geographic area usually thought of as "Appalachia". For instance, parts of Mississippi were included in the commission because of similar problems with unemployment and poverty. More recently, the Youngstown, Ohio region was declared part of Appalachia by the ARC due to the collapse of the steel industry in the region in the early 1980s and the continuing unemployment problems in the region since.

See also
 Appalachian Mountains
 Delta Regional Authority
 Denali Commission
 List of Appalachian Regional Commission counties
 List of micro-regional organizations
 Northern Border Regional Commission
 Southeast Crescent Regional Commission
 Tennessee Valley Authority
 War on poverty

Notes

Further reading

External links
 
 Appalachian Regional Commission in the Federal Register
 Appalachian Regional Commission on USAspending.gov

Appalachia
United States federal boards, commissions, and committees
Geography of Appalachia
Economic development organizations in the United States
Rural community development
Rural development in the United States